Bounou may refer to:

People
Djamalldine Bounou (born 1991), Comorian footballer
Mehdi Bounou (born 1997), Belgian footballer
Yassine Bounou (born 1991), Moroccan footballer

Places
Bounou, Bagassi, town in the Bagassi Department of Balé Province in southern Burkina Faso
Bounou, Yaba, town in the Yaba Department of Nayala Province in north-western Burkina Faso